The 1986 Richmond Spiders football team was an American football team that represented the University of Richmond as a member of the Yankee Conference during the 1986 NCAA Division I-AA football season. In their seventh season under head coach Dal Shealy, Richmond compiled a 4–7 record, with a mark of 3–4 in conference play, finishing finishing tied for fifth in the Yankee.

Schedule

References

Richmond
Richmond Spiders football seasons
Richmond Spiders